Melinda Kgadiete (born 21 July 1992) is a South African soccer player who plays as a forward for Mamelodi Sundowns Ladies FC and the South Africa women's national team.

Club career
Kgadiete has played for Mamelodi Sundowns in South Africa.

International career
Kgadiete competed for the South Africa women's national soccer team at the 2018 Africa Women Cup of Nations, playing in one match.

References

1992 births
Living people
South African women's soccer players
Women's association football forwards
South Africa women's international soccer players